David Osaretin Agbontohoma (born 30 September 2001) is an English professional footballer who plays for Boreham Wood, as a centre-back.

Career

Sheffield Wednesday
Agbontohoma joined Sheffield Wednesday following a trial on 1 July 2021. He made his debut against Harrogate Town in the EFL Trophy on 9 November 2021. On 20 July 2022, it was confirmed that Agbontohoma had extended his stay at the club.

Boreham Wood
On 6 January 2023, Agbontohoma joined Boreham Wood on a one-month loan. He made his debut the day later against Accrington Stanley in the FA Cup the following day playing the full 90 minutes. His loan was turned permanent on 2 February 2023.

Career statistics

References

External links

2001 births
Living people
Footballers from Hamburg
English footballers
Arsenal F.C. players
Southampton F.C. players
Sheffield Wednesday F.C. players
Boreham Wood F.C. players
Association football defenders
Black British sportsmen
English Football League players
National League (English football) players